Cota or COTA may refer to:

People

Surname
 Chad Cota, American football player
 Ed Cota, American basketball player
 Humberto Cota, Mexican baseball player
 Leonel Cota Montaño, Mexican politician
 Norman Cota, United States Army officer who fought during World War II
 Rodrigo Cota de Maguaque, Spanish poet

Given name
 Cotah Ramaswami, Indian cricket and tennis player

Places
  Circuit of the Americas, a race track near Austin, Texas, United States
 Cota, Cundinamarca, a municipality in the department of Cundinamarca, Colombia
 Cota Creek, a tributary of the Upper Mississippi River in Iowa, United States

Other
 Celebration of the Arts Festival
 Central Ohio Transit Authority
 Children's Organ Transplant Association
 College of the Arts, Windhoek
 Council on the Ageing
 Cota (plant), a genus of plants of the tribe Anthemideae, native to Europe, North Africa, and southwestern Asia, used for tea
 Cota (grasshopper), a genus of grasshoppers in the family Tetrigidae
 Cota (power), a wireless power technology
 X-Men: Children of the Atom (video game)